Abū Yaʿqūb Isḥāq ibn Ḥunayn (c. 830 Baghdad, – c. 910-1) was an influential Arab physician and translator, known for writing the first biography of physicians in the Arabic language. He is also known for his  translations of Euclid's Elements and Ptolemy's Almagest. He is the son of the famous translator Hunayn Ibn Ishaq.

References
  (PDF version)

See also
 Hunayn ibn Ishaq, his father.
 List of Muslim scientists and scholars

830s births
910 deaths
9th-century Arabs
10th-century Arabs
Greek–Arabic translators
Physicians from the Abbasid Caliphate
Mathematicians from the Abbasid Caliphate
9th-century physicians
Converts to Islam
9th-century people from the Abbasid Caliphate